Pleurosternon is an extinct genus of freshwater pleurosternid turtle from the latest Jurassic to earliest Cretaceous of Europe. Its type species, P. bullocki was described by the paleontologist Richard Owen (noted for coining the word Dinosauria) in 1853. Since then, and throughout the late 19th century, many fossil turtles were incorrectly assigned to this genus, though only two are currently considered valid.

Taxonomy
Pleurosternon bullocki fossils were first described by Richard Owen in 1841 from specimens found in the earliest Cretaceous (Berriasian) aged Purbeck Group of the Isle of Purbeck, of Dorset in southern England, under the living genus Platemys. It was not until 1853 however, that it was published under the name Pleurosternon in a paper Owen presented to the Palaeontographical Society. P. portlandicum named by Richard Lydekker in 1889 from the latest Jurassic (Tithonian) aged Portland Stone of the Isle of Portland, Dorset, is now considered a junior synonym of the P. bullocki. In 2021 a second valid species, Pleurosternon moncayensis, was named from the Ágreda locality of Tarazona y el Moncayo, Aragon, Spain, which spans the Tithonian-Berriasian transition.

Description

Pleurosternon has a very depressed carapace, much flatter than similar genera, such as the North American Late Jurassic and Early Cretaceous Glyptops. Adults show little or none of the nuchal emargination that is more visible in juveniles. The Xiphiplastras also have a large, V-shaped notch near the back of the bone. The skull of P. bullocki is similar to that of other pleurosternids, and is similar in some aspects to those of pleurodires. The known shell specimens of P. bullocki exhibit a large amount of variability, and also exhibit sexual dimorphism.

Distribution and habitat
In Europe, P. bullocki is best known from southeast England's Purbeck Group and Portland stone, with over sixty carapaces known from the Purbeck Group alone. Several areas within the formation became noted by some for producing Pleurosternon fossils. Among them were Swanage, Durlston Bay, Langton Matravers, and Herston. P. bullocki is also known from disarticulated shell elements found in Tithonian aged deposits near Wimille in Pas-de-Calais in northern France. As well as from numerous remains found in the Berriasian aged Angeac-Charente bonebed in western France, where it is the most abundant turtle. The Purbeck Group, at the time was a coastal region with a complex system of shallow lagoons that slowly lost their salinity over time. The Portland stone, however is a maritime deposit of slightly older age than the Purbeck, most bones found there are interpreted as having washed out to sea.

See also
 Glyptops
 Chengyuchelys
 Helochelys

References

External links
at Paleofile.com
Dinohunter
at Biolib.cz
taxonomic history
More taxonomy (French)

Pleurosternidae
Prehistoric turtle genera
Late Jurassic turtles
Early Cretaceous turtles
Late Jurassic reptiles of Europe
Early Cretaceous reptiles of Europe
Jurassic England
Cretaceous England
Fossils of England
Jurassic France
Cretaceous France
Fossils of France
Jurassic Spain
Cretaceous Spain
Fossils of Spain
Tithonian genus first appearances
Berriasian genus extinctions
Fossil taxa described in 1853
Taxa named by Richard Owen